Shuvosauridae is an extinct family of theropod-like pseudosuchians within the clade Poposauroidea. Shuvosaurids existed in North America (United States) and South America (Argentina) during the Late Triassic period (late Carnian to Rhaetian stages). Shuvosauridae was named by Sankar Chatterjee in 1993 to include the genus Shuvosaurus.

In a 2007 study Chatterjeea was demonstrated to be a junior synonym of Shuvosaurus, and the therein cladistic analysis found that Shuvosaurus, Effigia and Sillosuchus all form a closely related group. However, this group was left nameless, and simply referred to as Group Y. However, in accordance with ICZN rules of naming priority Shuvosauridae has priority over Chatterjeeidae (Shuvosauridae being named in 1993, while Chatterjeeidae was named in 1995). In 2011, Sterling J. Nesbitt proposed a new definition to this clade: "The least inclusive clade containing Shuvosaurus inexpectatus Chatterjee, 1993, and Sillosuchus longicervix Alcober and Parrish, 1997".

References

Poposauroids
Triassic archosaurs
Triassic reptiles of North America
Triassic reptiles of South America
Carnian first appearances
Rhaetian extinctions
Prehistoric reptile families